Javier Garcia (born March 23, 1998) is an American professional soccer player who currently plays for El Paso Locomotive in the USL Championship.

Career

Youth & College
Garcia played with the Rio Grande Valley FC academy between 2017 and 2020, before going on to play college soccer at the University of Texas Rio Grande Valley in 2020. Garcia was with the Vaqueros between 2020 and 2021, but didn't make an appearance for the team.

Professional
On August 17, 2021, Garcia signed his first professional contract, joining his former youth club Rio Grande Valley FC of the USL Championship.

On January 6, 2023, Garcia joined USL Championship side El Paso Locomotive for their 2023 season.

References

External links
 

1998 births
Living people
American soccer players
Association football goalkeepers
El Paso Locomotive FC players
People from Mission, Texas
Rio Grande Valley FC Toros players
Soccer players from Texas
UT Rio Grande Valley Vaqueros men's soccer players
USL Championship players